Jay Arthur Pritzker (August 26, 1922 – January 23, 1999) was an American entrepreneur, conglomerate organizer, and member of the Pritzker family.

Early life and education
Pritzker was born in Chicago, Illinois to Jewish parents. Pritzker's grandparents emigrated from Ukraine to the United States in 1881. A son of Fanny (née Doppelt) and Abram Nicholas Pritzker, he had two brothers: Donald and Robert Pritzker.  At the age of 14, Pritzker was admitted to the University of Chicago. He then went on to graduate with a B.S. from Northwestern University in 1941 and a J.D. from the Northwestern University School of Law in 1947. Pritzker served in WWII as a naval aviator

Career
Pritzker diversified the Chicago-based family business—which then consisted of the Pritzker & Pritzker law firm run by his uncle, Harry, and the investments made by his father and his uncle, Jack — into the Marmon Group holding company. With his brother, Robert, he built a portfolio of 60 diversified industrial corporations. He created the Hyatt Hotel chain in 1957 with his brother Donald Pritzker and owned Braniff Airlines from 1983–1988.

In 1979 he established the Pritzker Architecture Prize. In 1982, he acquired Ticketmaster and expanded it before selling 80% for more than $325 million to Microsoft co-founder Paul Allen in 1993.

In 1979, Pritzker received the Golden Plate Award of the American Academy of Achievement.

In 1996, he and his wife, Cindy, received the National Building Museum's Honor Award.
In 2004, the Jay Pritzker Pavilion, designed by architect Frank Gehry, was completed as part of Millennium Park in downtown Chicago.

Personal life
Pritzker was married to Marian "Cindy" Friend, the daughter of Illinois appellate judge Hugo Friend, for 51 years. They had five children:
Nancy Pritzker (born 1948), died by suicide in 1972 at age 24. The University of Chicago medical school is named for her.
Thomas Pritzker (born 1950), served as chairman of Hyatt Foundation, chairman of Marmon Holdings, and as a director of Royal Caribbean, and the Pritzker Foundation.
John Pritzker (born 1953), runs his own private equity firm Geolo Capital, which focuses on investments in hospitality, entertainment and health and wellness companies. In 2010, he purchased a majority interest in the Joie de Vivre hotel chain and later merging it with the Pomeranc family's Thompson Hotel Group.
Daniel Pritzker (born 1959), musician and filmmaker who served as a trustee of the Jay Pritzker Foundation along with his wife, Karen. He also founded the Jay Pritzker Academy in Ta Chet, Cambodia; and is a prominent supporter of Providence St. Mel School in Chicago and Tufts University. He is the owner of Jerry Garcia's famed guitar "Wolf", which he purchased at auction for $789,500.
Jean "Gigi" Pritzker (born 1962), film and play producer and is CEO of Odd Lot Entertainment.

See also
Smith v. Van Gorkom
 Pritzker family
 The ITT Wars

References

External links
Jay Pritzker Pavilion @ Millennium Park, Chicago 

1922 births
1999 deaths
American billionaires
20th-century American businesspeople
Braniff
Hyatt people
Businesspeople from Chicago
Jay Pritzker
American people of Ukrainian-Jewish descent
Philanthropists from Illinois
20th-century American philanthropists
Northwestern University alumni
Northwestern University Pritzker School of Law alumni
University of Chicago alumni
20th-century American Jews